Bardineto is a comune (municipality) in the Province of Savona in the Italian region Liguria, located about  southwest of Genoa and about  southwest of Savona.

Bardineto borders the following municipalities: Boissano, Calizzano, Castelvecchio di Rocca Barbena, Garessio, Giustenice, Loano, Magliolo, Pietra Ligure, and Toirano.

See also 
 Colle Scravaion
 Giogo di Toirano
 Rocca Barbena

References

Cities and towns in Liguria